The 1972–73 Liga Española de Baloncesto season was the 17th season of the Liga Española de Baloncesto and was played between 28 October 1972 and 27 May 1973. The season ended with Real Madrid winning their 15th title.

Overview before the season
16 teams joined the league, including four promoted from the 1971–72 Segunda División.

Promoted from 1971–72 Segunda División
Vasconia
Águilas Schweppes
Ignis Mataró
Manresa

Teams and locations
<onlyinclude>

Regular season

League table

Relegation playoffs

|}

Statistics leaders

Points

References

ACB.com  
Linguasport 
FEB 

Liga Española de Baloncesto (1957–1983) seasons
   
Spanish